Easter Island is located in the Pacific Ocean.  Though its earliest inhabitants, the Rapa Nui People, are ethnically Polynesian, the island is part of the South American state of Chile. The music of the island combines influences from both cultures.

History
Traditional music from the island consists of choral singing and chanting, similar to Tahitian music.  Families often performed as choirs, competing in an annual concert.  They were accompanied by a trumpet made from a conch shell and a percussive dancer jumping onto a stone which is set over a calabash resonator.  Other instruments include the kauaha, the jaw bone of a horse; upaupa; an accordion; and stones, which are clapped together for percussive effect.

Due to ongoing contacts with Chile and elsewhere in South America, Latin American music has had influences on the music of Easter Island.  Tango, for example, has spawned an Easter Island style called tango Rapanui, characterized by a simple guitar accompaniment instead of the frenetic bandoneon.

The first music school on the island was opened in 2012 by Mahani Teave, and teaches piano, cello, ukulele, and violin.

See also
Matato'a
Music of Chile

References

EASTER ISLAND MUSIC
Easter Island
Real Audio sample of Easter Island music on David Y. Brookman's Easter Island Home Page

Chilean music
Polynesian music
Easter Island